The Frank McKinnon Scholarship is bursary awarded by the Manitoba Junior Hockey League in honour of former Commissioner Frank McKinnon.  It provides an opportunity for players to apply for a scholarship based on their academic and hockey accomplishments.

Frank McKinnon, (June 16, 1934–May 31, 2015) served 18 years as a member (five years as President) of the Manitoba Amateur Hockey Association (now Hockey Manitoba) and five year as a member (three years as Chairman) of the Canadian Amateur Hockey Association. He was a Vice-President and Director of the Sports Federation of Canada, a Vice-President of the Canadian Olympic Association, a Congress member of the International Ice Hockey Federation and a Trustee of the Centennial Cup. Frank McKinnon was also the Commissioner of the MJHL for many years.

Scholarship winners

See also
Frank McKinnon

References

External links
Manitoba Junior Hockey League

Manitoba Junior Hockey League trophies and awards
Scholarships in Canada